Silver selenite is an inorganic compound of formula Ag2SeO3.

Production
Silver selenite is formed during the recovery of selenium from copper anode slimes when they are subjected to oxidative roasting, causing some silver selenide to be converted to the selenite. It can also be prepared by a precipitation reaction between silver nitrate and sodium selenite:

Another method is the reaction between selenium and silver nitrate:

3 Se + 6 AgNO3 + 3 H2O → 2 Ag2Se + Ag2SeO3 + 6 HNO3

References

External links
 External MSDS

Selenites
Silver compounds